Lomita, also known as Lomita Village, is an urban neighborhood in the southeastern area of San Diego, California. It is bounded by Meadowbrook Drive and Skyline West to the west, unincorporated La Presa to the east and Skyline East to the south, and Jamacha to the north. Major thoroughfares in the neighborhood include San Vicente Street and Worthington Avenue.  The neighborhood is part of the Skyline-Paradise Hills Community Planning Area.

Background
Lomita Village was largely built in the early 1950s and held a large military family population. Lomita is a largely residential district, with some small-scale commercial development.

Geography
The Skyline-Paradise Hills Community as a whole makes up approximately 4,500 acres. Much like the surrounding neighborhoods of Bay Terraces, Skyline, and Paradise Hills, Lomita is comprised predominantly of low-density single-family homes spread across the hilly area. A major geographic feature is Paradise Valley, which runs on an east-west axis through the middle of the community and gives rise to the Paradise Creek, which flows into San Diego Bay. Lomita, along with Jamacha, Skyline, and North Bay Terrace, are directly north of Paradise Valley.

Demographics
Demographic statistics are only available for Lomita in conjunction with bordering Jamacha.  Jamacha-Lomita is very diverse. Combined, the demographics for Jamacha-Lomita are as follows: Hispanic-Latino are the largest group at 51.1%, followed by African-Americans at 17.7%, Asian at 13.6%, non-Hispanic Whites at 13.0%, Mixed race at 3.9% and others at 0.7%.

References

Neighborhoods in San Diego